Richard Lee Young (born January 3, 1953) is a United States district judge of the United States District Court for the Southern District of Indiana.

Education and career

Born in Davenport, Iowa, Young received a Bachelor of Arts degree from Drake University in 1975 and a Juris Doctor from George Mason University School of Law in 1980. He was in private practice in Evansville, Indiana from 1980 to 1990, also serving as a public defender (part-time) for the Vanderburgh Circuit Court from 1983 to 1985, and as corporation counsel to the City of Evansville, from 1985 to 1987. He was a circuit judge of the Vanderburgh Circuit Court from 1990 to 1998.

Federal judicial service

On July 15, 1997, Young was nominated by President Bill Clinton to a seat on the United States District Court for the Southern District of Indiana vacated by Gene Edward Brooks. Young was confirmed by the United States Senate in an 81-0 vote on March 2, 1998, and received his commission on March 6, 1998. He served as Chief Judge from 2009 to 2016.

On June 25, 2014, Judge Young struck down Indiana's ban on same-sex marriage without issuing a stay of his ruling. This ruling was affirmed by the United States Court of Appeals for the Seventh Circuit and review was denied by the United States Supreme Court.

In 2021, Judge Young ruled in favor of Roncalli High School after they dismissed a guidance counselor in a same-sex marriage ruling that guidance counselors at a religious school fall under the "ministerial exception" from discrimination based on sexual orientation in employment cases.

References

Sources

|-

1953 births
20th-century American judges
21st-century American judges
Antonin Scalia Law School alumni
Drake University alumni
Judges of the United States District Court for the Southern District of Indiana
Living people
People from Davenport, Iowa
Public defenders
United States district court judges appointed by Bill Clinton